Mathew Campbell (born 20 June 1976) is an Australian former professional basketball player who played his entire career for the Wollongong Hawks of the National Basketball League (NBL).

NBL career
Born in Bendigo, Victoria, Campbell joined the Illawarra Hawks in 1996, and remained with the club for 17 seasons. In his rookie season, he played in the NBL's Future Forces Game. In 1999, he finished third in voting for the NBL Best Defensive Player Award, and the following season, became the captain of the Hawks. He and long-time teammate Glen Saville helped the Hawks win their maiden NBL championship in 2001 and finish runners-up in 2005. He scored a career-best 36 points against the Townsville Crocodiles in Townsville on 5 December 2005, including 9-of-14 from three-pointer range.

Campbell led the "Save the Hawks" campaign in February 2009 to ensure Wollongong's further participation in the NBL. He helped the team raise significant funds as well as obtaining a $1 million guarantee from Gujarat NRE and gaining Australian Health Management as their naming rights sponsor.

In 2009, Campbell had his iconic No. 32 singlet retired by the Hawks. He is one of only five Illawarra/Wollongong players to have had their jersey retired.

On 15 March 2012, Campbell announced his retirement from professional basketball. He completed his 17-year NBL career as the Hawks' all-time games played leader with 524 (Glen Saville surpassed that record during the 2012–13 season), and the club's three-pointers made leader with 1,049. In 524 career games, he averaged 11.7 points, 2.9 rebounds and 2.0 assists per game.

On 6 April 2018, the Illawarra Hawks announced Campbell as their new General Manager heading into the 18/19 season.

National team career
Campbell was a member of the Under 23 Australian squad in 1996, and played for the Australian team during their tours to China and Europe in 2002. Two years later, he trialled for the Boomers to compete in the 2004 Athens Olympic Games, but was cut from the squad ahead of the games.

References

External links

NBL stats

1976 births
Living people
Australian men's basketball players
Illawarra Hawks players
Sportspeople from Bendigo
Shooting guards
Small forwards
Wollongong Hawks players